"Whisper Not" is a composition by Benny Golson. It is in a minor key and contains a shout chorus (a special chorus between the final solo and the closing head). Golson's account of writing the piece is that "I wrote it in Boston at George Wein's Storyville club when I was with Dizzy Gillespie's big band. I wrote that tune in 20 minutes." Some sources indicate that the first recording was by Gillespie, while others indicate that trumpeter Lee Morgan was first.

It quickly became popular with other musicians: Thad Jones and Morgan recorded their own versions before its composer had the chance to record it with his own group. Golson's early version was on his 1957 album Benny Golson's New York Scene. By 1960, John S. Wilson, critic at The New York Times, had labelled the song, together with another Golson composition, "I Remember Clifford", "an established part of the jazz repertory". It has been recorded by hundreds of musicians, becoming a jazz standard. Leonard Feather added lyrics, which were recorded by Anita O'Day in 1962 and later by several other prominent vocalists.

Half a century after its composition, Golson remained strongly associated with the tune, and named one of his tours – the "Whisper Not Tour" – after it.

Other recordings 
 Art Blakey with Lee Morgan and Benny Golson 1958 – Paris Olympia (Fontana, 1958)
 Ella Fitzgerald – Whisper Not (Verve, 1965)
 Benny Golson with Art Farmer – Benny Golson's New York Scene (Contemporary, 1957)
 Oscar Peterson – The Trio (Verve, 1961)
 Ray Bryant – Ray Bryant Plays (Signature, 1959)
 Shelly Manne – Shelly Manne and His Men at the Black Hawk, Vol. 3 (Contemporary, 1959)
 Ahmad Jamal – Extensions (Argo, 1966)
 Lee Morgan with Horace Silver and Hank Mobley – Lee Morgan Sextet (Blue Note, 1956)
 Anita O'Day – Anita O'Day & the Three Sounds (Verve, 1962)

See also
List of post-1950 jazz standards

References

1950s jazz standards
1956 compositions
Jazz compositions
Songs with music by Benny Golson
1956 songs
Songs written by Leonard Feather